Banzai is a British comedy gambling game show which spoofs Japanese game shows and general television style. It was produced by Radar, part of RDF Media. Each segment of the show is a silly or bizarre contest. Members of the viewing audience were encouraged to bet with each other on the outcome of each segment.

Format
The show plays off like a betting show. In each segment, a bizarre challenge is presented with a choice of outcomes. Viewers are given a short amount of time to 'place their bets' before the challenge starts.

Betting contests on the show included grannies playing chicken with motorized wheelchairs, amputee football, egg eating, blindfolded gas pumping, and the length of time it would take an object to hit the ground after being dropped from a roof. The show also sometimes intentionally skirted the bounds of what some would consider appropriate television content; as in contests to guess which person in a lineup has the longest penis, or the biggest breast implants, or how long it takes a madagascar hissing cockroach to microwave.

The voiceovers (especially those by Burt Kwouk) are English deliberately spoken with a heavily exaggerated Asian accent ("prace your bets – no bet, no get"!). Many minor celebrities take part in the stunts, and the occasional more major celebrities like Rutger Hauer. Usually the celebrity would be ridiculed in the segment. Actor Peter Davison, for example, who formerly played The Doctor on Doctor Who, was asked which other Doctor Who actor (from Tom Baker, Jon Pertwee and Sylvester McCoy) he would most like to have sex with.

Virtually every segment features background music, taken from the 1980s United Kingdom charts, with some from the 1970s.

Characters
The show's MC, Mr Banzai, played by opera singer Masashi Fujimoto, does not speak except for saying and singing the word "Banzai" in different ways. Mr Banzai acts as referee for many of the contests, directing participants to begin by solemnly clapping his hands and emitting a kiai.

Other regular contributors include Mr Shake-Hands Man played by Ryozo Kohira who tries to maintain a handshake with people for as long as possible. He was later replaced when he became too well known with Mr Shake-Hands Man 2 (played by Japanese-American actor Tadao Tomomatsu), who did the same thing, although his role was mainly with celebrities.

There is also Lady One Question played by non-professional Shizuka Hata, who poses as a celebrity reporter, asks a single interview question and then stares silently at the interviewee. In both of these segments, viewers are invited to bet on how long it takes the celebrity to put a stop to the ruse. Often appearing between segments is Mr Cheeky Chappie (Jit Loi Chong), wiggling his spectacles and grinning. Voiceovers are provided by Burt Kwouk and Eiji Kusuhara.

Broadcast history
Banzai first aired in the United Kingdom on the digital channel E4. It was repeated a few months later on E4's parent channel, Channel 4. It has been repeated on 3 other channels in the United Kingdom: Challenge, Dave and 4Music. It was later picked up for broadcast in Canada by Citytv, which broadcast the original, uncut, un-edited episodes.

It was broadcast in the United States for a short time only, and in a different format where the segments were cut up and interspersed with a movie. Then in 2003, Fox picked up the series in the United States (and Americanized it by editing content and saying that some of the people were from the United States instead of parts of the United Kingdom), airing its first episode on 13 July.

It also aired in Brazil in 2005 on the cable channel Multishow. It was broadcast with subtitles with no editing whatsoever.

After six episodes, however, pressure from Asian American groups led Fox to drop the show. In early 2004, the show found a new home on Comedy Central. Re-runs moved once again on March 6, 2006 to G4 as part of its late-night prime programming block, Midnight Spank (formerly known as G4 Late Nights and Barbed Wire Biscuit). The recently opened Philippine cable channel Jack TV also runs Banzai in a primetime weekend slot. Philippine channel RPN also runs the series every Thursday night at 7:30pm. It also airs in Australia on Fox8 and Channel V.

In early 2002, it was also broadcast in Italy on MTV Italy on Friday nights with Italian dubbing. It was also broadcast in United States on Fox 5 and Fox 5 HD on Wednesday nights. Banzai is sometimes mistaken for a Japanese-produced show, such as on Comcast's interactive guide, however it should be noted it is merely a British show, inspired by Japanese television.

Mr Shake-Hands Man
Among the people Mr Shake-Hands Man (sometimes known as Shakey-Hands Man or Mr Shakey-Hand Man), has shaken hands with are:
 Kelsey Grammer
 Angelina Jolie
 Bill Murray
 Chris Tarrant
 Donna Air
He also shook the hand of Def Leppard drummer Rick Allen.  One of the last handshakes was with Jackie Collins and it did not last very long as she forced his hand off hers with her other hand.

Mr Shake-Hands Man 2 had a slightly different tactic to the original Mr Shake-Hands Man. Mr Shake-Hands Man 2 would pose as a Japanese reporter and often translate dialogue into Japanese to make conversations (and handshakes) last a little longer.

Controversy
In August 2001, two years before Fox aired its first episode of Banzai, USA Network aired clips of the Channel 4 edition of the show as part of their Banzai Movie Friday. Some Asian American groups objected to the clips.

When Fox picked up the show, the Media Action Network for Asian-Americans protested outside a presentation of the show in Hollywood. Group co-founder Guy Aoki told BBC News, "It's just all the backward images of Asian American people. This is like an Asian minstrel show. Can you imagine the black version of Banzai?". When sponsors were alerted to the content of the show, many dropped their sponsorship, and as a result, Fox canceled Banzai.

In April 2002, the show caused further controversy. This was when they attempted to record a sketch, during the funeral of Queen Elizabeth The Queen Mother. The film crew were reportedly trying to measure the speed of the funeral procession, with a speed gun to allow viewers to bet on the speed. The police however stopped this, before the procession could pass.

Transmissions

Series

Specials

Merchandise

Book

VHS

DVD

DVD betting game
RDF, the licence-holder of "Banzai", has also worked in conjunction with Screenlife, the makers of the popular Scene It? DVD games, to make possible the creation of a DVD board game for the show (Banzai.com). Board Game creators Gary McGrew and Nick Saad can be seen as animated figures in the "How to Play" section of the DVD. The game DVD is packed with many of the best clips from the programme and uses plastic sushi pieces as the main betting and winning device.

Players must use chopsticks to transfer four types of wacky sushi characters (King Fu Carl – the world's last starfish assassin, Lois – the Louisiana Squirrel Roll, Chum and Tako's Tentacle) into the main community betting bowl. Whoever transfers the most for that round gets to put down a numbered or lettered betting card in conjunction with the "Banzai" clip in the hopes of getting it right and winning all the sushi in the community bowl.

The player with the most sushi wins the game. The "underground" appeal of the show and the game has also contributed to drinking game rules. The show's MC, Mr Banzai, also starred in the making of the DVD as the man who jumped out and shouted "DVD!" and did a number of comical things on the DVD.

There was another DVD called Super Banzai Video Show, which was similar but players just played with the DVD player and the remote.  Mr Banzai shocks viewers by jumping in front of the copyright warning at the beginning of the disc.  Players are then asked to guess which letter is the Super-Banzai DVD button, A, B or C.  If viewers select C, they see about 30 seconds of Tony Hart standing staring at them without saying anything. The correct button is B. Banzai – DVD Betting Game was released 16 September 2011

Soundtrack
The Banzai soundtrack was released by 4Music 18 June 2001 on CD.

References

External links

Banzai at BFI

2001 British television series debuts
2003 British television series endings
2000s British comedy television series
2000s British game shows
British parody television series
Channel 4 comedy
Channel 4 game shows
English-language television shows
Television shows about gambling
Television series by Banijay